Alessandro Tanara (1680-1754) was an Italian Roman Catholic cardinal.

Biography 
He was born in Bologna to the aristocratic Tanara family. Alessandro came to Rome in 1696 to study and work with the mentorship of his uncle, Cardinal Sebastiano Antonio Tanara. In 1743, after being auditore della Rota (auditor of the apostolic tribunal) for ten years, he was made cardinal by pope Benedict XIV. He wrote a manuscript on the decisions of his court Sacrae Rotae Romana Decisiones.

References

1680 births
1754 deaths
18th-century Italian cardinals
People from Bologna